Pseudophilotes panoptes, the Panoptes blue, is a butterfly of the family Lycaenidae. It is found on the Iberian Peninsula and in North Africa, including Morocco.

It is very like Pseudophilotes baton but  without the reddish yellow anal spots. 
The wingspan is 18–22 mm. There are two generations per year with adults on wing from March to August.

The larvae feed on Thymus species.

References

External links
Captain's European Butterfly Guide

Polyommatini
Butterflies described in 1813
Butterflies of Africa
Butterflies of Europe
Taxa named by Jacob Hübner